Akinkhovskaya is a rural locality (a village) in Shelotskoye Rural Settlement, Verkhovazhsky District, Vologda Oblast, Russia. The population was 8 as of 2002.

Geography 
Akinkhovskaya is located 71 km southwest of Verkhovazhye (the district's administrative centre) by road. Stolbovo is the nearest rural locality.

References 

Rural localities in Verkhovazhsky District